Davita Prendergast (born 6 December 1984 in Westmoreland) is a Jamaican sprinter, who specializes in the 400 meters.



Career

She ran the 4 x 400 meters relay with Jamaica at the 2007 World Championships in Athletics and the team took the silver medal and recorded a Central American and Caribbean record in the process. Prendergast came in with the Jamaican relay team at the 2010 World Indoor Championships in third place, but was stripped of the bronze medal because of the disqualification of Bobby-Gaye Wilkins.

Achievements

Personal bests
200 meters – 23.34 seconds (2007)
400 meters – 51.24 seconds (2007)

References

1984 births
Living people
Jamaican female sprinters
People from Westmoreland Parish
World Athletics Championships medalists
Athletes (track and field) at the 2007 Pan American Games
Athletes (track and field) at the 2010 Commonwealth Games
Central American and Caribbean Games medalists in athletics
Commonwealth Games competitors for Jamaica
Pan American Games competitors for Jamaica
20th-century Jamaican women
21st-century Jamaican women